Mountain Meadow Farm is a historic home and barn located in Newlin Township, Chester County, Pennsylvania. The house was built about 1800, and is a two-story, brick dwelling with basement and attic in the Georgian style. A rear addition was built in 1951. It has a gable roof, full width front porch, and double-door facade.  The large stone and frame bank barn was built about 1860.

It was added to the National Register of Historic Places in 1985.

References

Houses on the National Register of Historic Places in Pennsylvania
Barns on the National Register of Historic Places in Pennsylvania
Georgian architecture in Pennsylvania
Houses completed in 1800
Houses in Chester County, Pennsylvania
Barns in Pennsylvania
National Register of Historic Places in Chester County, Pennsylvania